Charles Mve Ellah is a Gabonese politician. He is the current National Secretary of Culture, the Arts, Sports and Leisure under the ruling Gabonese Democratic Party (Parti démocratique gabonais) (PDG).

References

Gabonese Democratic Party politicians
Living people
Year of birth missing (living people)
Government ministers of Gabon
21st-century Gabonese people